James Carnegie, 5th Earl of Southesk (1692–1730) was a Scottish nobleman. He inherited the earldom 14 May 1700. He was attainted of the earldom in 1716.

References

1692 births
1730 deaths
Earls of Southesk